Sybrant is an unincorporated community in Rock County, Nebraska, United States.

History
A post office was established at Sybrant in 1895, and remained in operation until it was discontinued in 1932. The community was named for David O. Sybrant.

References

Unincorporated communities in Rock County, Nebraska
Unincorporated communities in Nebraska